John Henry Taylor (6 October 1935 – 5 January 2017) was an English footballer.

Taylor signed for Newcastle United in 1951, and made his debut for the first team against Sheffield United in 1955. He was mainly used as back up to either Jackie Milburn or Len White. He was later loaned out to Fulham, but when he returned to the Magpies the following season, he found it hard to displace Gordon Hughes. Taylor left the club in 1960 to join Chelmsford City, and would later play for Cambridge United, before coming back to Tyneside to work at Newcastle Breweries.

References

1935 births
2017 deaths
English footballers
Newcastle United F.C. players
Fulham F.C. players
Chelmsford City F.C. players
Cambridge United F.C. players
Association football forwards
English Football League players
Footballers from Gateshead